is a headland at the southeastern tip of the Japanese island of Shikoku, in the city of Muroto, Kōchi Prefecture.

Cultural features

Geology

Fauna
Birds observed in the vicinity of the cape include the osprey and blue rock thrush. Marine life in the waters offshore includes the Japanese amberjack, Japanese anchovy, Japanese barramundi, Japanese jack mackerel, Japanese mackerel, Japanese pilchard, Pacific mackerel, Blackfin seabass, three-line grunt, and spear squid.

Access
 Kochi Tobu Kotsu
 For Toyo・Kannoura Station
 For Muroto・Nahari Station・Yasuda・Aki Station・Aki Office
 Tokushima Bus
 For Maiko Bus stop・Namba Station
 Asa Seaside Railway (1 return on only holidays)
 For Awa-Kainan Station (extends to this station via Asato Line)

See also

 List of Places of Scenic Beauty of Japan (Kōchi)
 List of Natural Monuments of Japan (Kōchi)
 Muroto Typhoon, Second Muroto Typhoon
 Cape Ashizuri
 Kūkai
 Dual-mode vehicle (This transportation is operated for the first time in the world)

References

Muroto, Kōchi
Landforms of Kōchi Prefecture
Muroto
Places of Scenic Beauty
Natural monuments of Japan